The 2009–10 MTN Elite 1 is the 50th season of the Cameroonian Premier League, top football division in Cameroon.

Clubs

League table

Results

External links 
 2009–10 in Cameroonian football at Rec.Sport.Soccer Statistics Foundation

Cam
1
1
Elite One seasons